Yde Johan "Eddy" van Hijum (born 17 April 1972 in Delft) is a Dutch politician. As a member of the Christian Democratic Appeal (Christen-Democratisch Appèl) he was an MP from 2 September 2003 till 11 November 2014. He focused on matters of social security, income policy, dismissal law, labor participation policy and day care. Since 12 November 2014 he has been a member of the Gedeputeerde Staten of the province of Overijssel. He holds the portfolio of Economy, Energy and Innovation. In the House of Representatives he was replaced by Martijn van Helvert. He served in the States of Overijssel from 26 March 2015 to 20 May 2015.

He served in the municipal council of Zwolle between 1998 and 2003. He was invested as a Knight of the Order of Orange-Nassau on his exit from the House.

References 

  Parlement.com biography

External links 
  House of Representatives biography

1972 births
Living people
Christian Democratic Appeal politicians
Protestant Church Christians from the Netherlands
Members of the House of Representatives (Netherlands)
Municipal councillors of Zwolle
People from Delft
Members of the Provincial Council of Overijssel
Members of the Provincial-Executive of Overijssel
Knights of the Order of Orange-Nassau
21st-century Dutch politicians